KIOL (1370 AM) is a radio station broadcasting a news/talk/sports format. The station's previous call letters were KALN, prior to August 12, 2008.  Licensed to Iola, Kansas, United States, the station serves Southeast Kansas. The station is currently owned by Iola Broadcasting, Inc. and features programming from Fox News Radio, Fox Sports Radio, Compass Media Networks, Premiere Networks, Salem Radio Network, and Westwood One.

References

External links

IOL
News and talk radio stations in the United States